Victoria Jane Dixon (born 5 August 1959 in Ormskirk, West Lancashire) is a former field hockey player from England, who was a member of the British squad that won the bronze medal at the 1992 Summer Olympics in Barcelona. She competed in two consecutive Summer Olympics, starting in 1988. She played for Ipswich Ladies Hockey Club.

External links
 
 
 
 
 
 Ipswich Hockey Club

English female field hockey players
Field hockey players at the 1988 Summer Olympics
Field hockey players at the 1992 Summer Olympics
Olympic field hockey players of Great Britain
British female field hockey players
Olympic bronze medallists for Great Britain
1959 births
Living people
People from Ormskirk
Place of birth missing (living people)
Olympic medalists in field hockey
Medalists at the 1992 Summer Olympics